Brian Keaney (born 1954) is a British author. He is an author of mainly young adult fiction, and currently resides in London where he continues work as an author.

Early life and career
Brian Keaney was born in Walthamstow, Essex, to Irish Catholic parents. He reported that he learned about narrative by listening to his mother who was a natural storyteller.

He attended a Catholic primary school in London which was run by nuns and a secondary school run by Jesuits. He did not enjoy his schooldays and reported that some teachers at his secondary school were overly fond of administering corporal punishment. His favorite academic subject was English, although he also had an interest in History and Latin, particularly liking Latin poetry.

Keaney eventually pursued a career as an English teacher. A librarian at a school he was working at introduced him to young adult fiction, piquing his interest so that he decided to write his own.

Personal life
Keaney currently lives in London with his wife. He has two grown up daughters.

Writing bibliography

Fiction
Don't Hang About (1986)
Some People Never Learn (1986)
No Need for Heroes (1989)
If This Is the Real World (1991)
Limited Damage (1991)
Boys Don't Write Love Stories (1993)
Family Secrets (1997)
The Private Life of Georgia Brown (1998)
Bitter Fruit (1999)
Balloon House (2000)
Falling for Joshua (2001)
No Stone Unturned (2001)
Where Mermaids Sing (2004)
Jacob's Ladder (2005)

Promises of Dr. Sigmundus
The Hollow People (2006)
The Gallow Glass/The Cracked Mirror (2007)
The Mendini Canticle/The Resurrection Fields (2008)

Nathaniel Wolfe
The Haunting of Nathaniel Wolfe (2008)
Nathaniel Wolfe and the Body Snatchers (2009)
The Magical Detective Agency
The Magical Detectives (2011)
The Magical Detectives and the Forbidden Spell (2011)

Non-fiction
Making Sense of English (1987)
Talking Sense (1987)
Sharing Experience (1991)
Taking Shape (1991)
Presenting Ideas (1992)
English in the School Grounds (1993)
The Way to Pass National Curriculum English: The Easy Way to Learn And Revise: 11-13 Years Level 5 (1994) (with Carol Vorderman)
Arts in the School Grounds (1996)

Plays
A Kiss from France (1990)
Boycott (1991)
Between Two Shores (1991)

Picture books
Only Made of Wood (1998)
That's What Friends Are For (2003)

References
Keaney, B 'Brian Keaney' http://www.briankeaney.com/index.php
Jubilee Books 'Author Profile - Brian Keaney' https://web.archive.org/web/20091009013303/http://www.jubileebooks.co.uk/jubilee/magazine/authors/brian_keaney/brian_keaney.asp
Fantastic Fiction 'Brian Keaney' http://www.fantasticfiction.co.uk/k/brian-keaney/

External links

1954 births
British children's writers
English children's writers
Living people
Writers from London
People from Walthamstow
English people of Irish descent
20th-century English novelists
21st-century English novelists